Nikola Vlašić (born 4 October 1997) is a Croatian professional footballer who plays as an attacking midfielder for Serie A club Torino, on loan from Premier League club West Ham United, and the Croatia national team.

Born in the Vlašić family, a prominent Croatian sports family, Nikola is a youth product of Hajduk Split academy. He made his senior debut in summer 2014, making The Guardian's Next Generation list later that year. In 2017, his performances earned him a move to Everton; however, after an unsuccessful season, he was loaned out to CSKA Moscow who made the move permanent upon the end of the season.

Vlašić made his international debut in 2017, before becoming a regular international after Croatia's 2018 FIFA World Cup campaign. He represented his country at the UEFA Euro 2020 and the 2022 FIFA World Cup.

Club career

Hajduk Split
Vlašić joined the Omladinac Vranjic academy, before he was brought to Hajduk Split, aged 12. He excelled at youth club level, and in the 2013–14 season he formed a potent midfield partnership for the Hajduk U17 team with Andrija Balić, which resulted in the team finishing the first half of the season in first place, without a single loss. The two then received and signed professional contracts, and were moved to the U19 team, where he played regularly.

He made his first team debut in the UEFA Europa League qualifying match on 17 July 2014, playing in the away match against Dundalk. Scoring on his debut, he became Hajduk Split's youngest scorer in international competitions, aged 16 years and 9 months, 2 months less than the previous record holder Mario Tičinović. That season, Vlašić went on to make 37 appearances in all competitions, scoring four goals.

On 30 June 2016, Hajduk announced that Vlašić had been appointed vice-captain of the club, with Lovre Kalinić continuing to be the captain. As Kalinić was on extended holidays as a result of being part of the Croatian squad for the UEFA Euro 2016, Vlašić captained Hajduk for the first time on 14 July, the season opening fixture; a 2–2 away draw against CSM Politehnica Iași in the second round of the 2016–17 Europa League qualifying phase. Despite his tender age, Vlašić would captain the side four more times that season.

Everton
On 31 August 2017, Vlašić signed a five-year contract with Premier League club Everton for a fee of around £10 million, which is the Hajduk Split record transfer. Vlašić impressed Everton manager Ronald Koeman and director of football Steve Walsh when Everton and Hajduk faced each other in the 2017–18 UEFA Europa League play-off round. Vlašić scored his first goal for Everton on his debut at Goodison Park on 28 September in a 2–2 draw with Apollon Limassol in the Europa League. He scored in the return leg on 7 December, as Everton won 3–0. After making only 19 appearances in all competitions, Vlašić was told at end of the season that he was not part of the future plans of new coach Marco Silva.

CSKA Moscow

On 15 August 2018, Russian club CSKA Moscow announced that Vlašić joined them on loan for the 2018–19 season. Three days later, he made his league debut in a 3–0 victory over Arsenal Tula. In his Champions League debut on 19 September, he scored both goals for CSKA Moscow in a 2–2 draw with Viktoria Plzeň. On 2 October Vlašić scored the only goal in a 1–0 home victory against the ruling champions Real Madrid in the Champions League. In the return leg on 12 December, he provided Arnór Sigurðsson with an assist for the third goal in a 3–0 victory, which is Madrid's highest ever European home defeat. Despite this, the Muscovites ended last in their group crashing out of the tournament. On 28 April 2019, he was sent off in a 2–0 defeat to Krasnodar. Vlašić finished the season with eight goals and seven assists.

Satisfied with his performances, CSKA announced the signing of Vlašić on a five-year contract for an undisclosed fee on 19 June from Everton. On 22 September, he won and successfully converted a penalty, provided Fyodor Chalov with an assist and scored in a 3–2 victory over Krasnodar. On 24 November, he scored the only goal in a 1–0 victory over Krylia Sovetov Samara. On 12 December, Vlašić scored the only goal in a 1–0 away victory over Espanyol in the Europa League. Nevertheless, CSKA ended last in their group crashing out of the tournament. On 30 June 2020, Vlašić scored both goals in a 2–0 derby win over Spartak Moscow. He finished his second season at the club with 13 goals and seven assists, as CSKA finished fourth in the league.

At the beginning of the 2020–21 season, Vlašić sparked interest from Napoli, Atalanta and Zenit Saint Petersburg; however, CSKA refused to sell the player. In his first game of the season, against ruling champions Zenit on 19 August, he scored CSKA's only goal in the 2–1 defeat. On 13 September, he scored in another Main Moscow derby as CSKA defeated Spartak 3–1. On 21 December, Vlašić was named Russian Premier League, Russian Football Union and Sport Express Footballer of the Year. He won 251 points, 138 ahead of second-placed Aleksei Miranchuk.

At the beginning of the 2021–22 season, Vlašić's relationship with CSKA deteriorated due to the club's hesitance to sell him.

West Ham United
On 31 August 2021, Vlašić joined Premier League club West Ham United on a five-year contract for an undisclosed fee. Some Croatian media outlets reported it to be €30 million with add-ons, which would make it the fourth most expensive transfer of a Croatian player in history.

He made his West Ham debut on 11 September in a goalless draw with Southampton. His first goal contribution for West Ham occurred on 25 November in a 2–0 victory over Rapid Vienna in the Europa League, when he provided Andriy Yarmolenko with an assist for the first goal. On 28 December, Vlašić scored his debut goal for West Ham, in a 4–1 victory over Watford. By the end of the season, he had played 552 minutes in league games, the least in his senior career. The aforementioned assist and goal were his only goal contributions.

Torino
On 11 August 2022, Vlašić joined Torino on-loan for the remainder of the 2022–23 season with an option to buy the player at the end of the loan.

International career

Vlašić made his debut for Croatia U16 at the age of 14, playing regularly with older teammates at U17 and U18 levels as well. On 28 May 2017, he made his debut for the senior team in a friendly match against Mexico after being named in the starting line-up. On 18 November 2018, he provided Andrej Kramarić with an assist in a UEFA Nations League match against England for a 0–1 lead, which Croatia eventually lost 2–1.

Vlašić was named in Croatia's squad for UEFA Under-21 Euro 2019. He scored in a 4–1 defeat to Romania and a 3–3 draw with England, on 18 and 24 June respectively.

On 6 September 2019, he scored his first goal for the senior squad in a Euro 2020 qualifying match against Slovakia for a 0–1 lead. Croatia won the game 0–4. On 13 October, Vlašić scored yet another opening goal in a 1–1 draw with Wales. On 16 November, he scored the equalizer against Slovakia at home, leading to Croatia's 3–1 victory and qualification for the tournament. However, in March 2020, the tournament was postponed for a year due to the COVID-19 pandemic.

On 11 October 2020, Vlašić scored the opener in a 2–1 UEFA Nations League victory over Sweden at Stadion Maksimir and followed it up three days later with a goal in a 2–1 loss to reigning world champions France at the same location.

On 17 May 2021, Vlašić was selected in Zlatko Dalić's 26-man squad for the UEFA Euro 2020, marking Vlašić's first major tournament appearance. He started off the bench in Croatia's first two matches against England and the Czech Republic, but on 22 June, he was named the Star of the Match in the 3–1 victory over Scotland―which qualified Croatia for the Round of 16―after scoring the opening goal.

On 9 November 2022, Vlašić was named in Dalić's 26-man squad for the 2022 FIFA World Cup. In the round of 16 and quarter-final matches against Japan and Brazil on 5 and 9 December, respectively—both of which led to a penalty shootout—Vlašić was the first to shoot for Croatia, scoring both times as Croatia progressed to the semi-final.

Personal life
Vlašić was born in Split to the family of former cross-country skier Venera Milin and athletics coach Joško Vlašić.  He is the younger brother of the world champion high jumper Blanka Vlašić. His father hails from Dubrava near Tisno. His mother was born and raised in Delnice, but her roots are from Jezera on the island of Murter. Vlašić's future football career was viewed as his father's "project", who started training him personally ever since he was four years old.

On 22 May 2021, Vlašić married his long-time girlfriend Ana in St. Lawrence's Church in Split. In late June of the same year, they became parents of a baby boy whom they named Noa.

Career statistics

Club

International

Scores and results list Croatia's goal tally first.

Honours
Croatia

 FIFA World Cup third place: 2022

Individual
 Russian Premier League Player of the Month: September 2018, December 2018, July 2020
 Sport-Express, Russian Football Union and Russian Premier League Footballer of the Year: 2020

References

External links
 

 
 Nikola Vlašić at HNK Hajduk Split (archived) 
 Nikola Vlašić at West Ham United F.C. (archived)

1997 births
Living people
Footballers from Split, Croatia
Association football midfielders
Croatian footballers
Croatia youth international footballers
Croatia under-21 international footballers
Croatia international footballers
UEFA Euro 2020 players
2022 FIFA World Cup players
HNK Hajduk Split players
Everton F.C. players
PFC CSKA Moscow players
West Ham United F.C. players
Torino F.C. players
Croatian Football League players
Premier League players
Russian Premier League players
Serie A players
Croatian expatriate footballers
Expatriate footballers in England
Expatriate footballers in Russia
Expatriate footballers in Italy
Croatian expatriate sportspeople in England
Croatian expatriate sportspeople in Russia
Croatian expatriate sportspeople in Italy